The California Cup Sprint Handicap is an American thoroughbred horse race run annually at Santa Anita Park in Arcadia, California during its Oak Tree Racing Association meet in the fall of the year. Raced on dirt over a distance of  six furlongs, it is open to horses three-year-olds and up of either gender who were bred in the state of California. The event currently offers a purse of $150,000 and a trophy.

The California Cup Sprint Handicap is part of the "California Cup Day" series of races intended to call attention to, and to honor, the California Thoroughbred racing and breeding industry.

Past winners

 2014 - Big Macher
 2013 - NO RACE
 2012 - Maui Mark
 2011 - Courtside
 2010 - Cost of Freedom
 2009 - Dancing in Silks
 2008 - Tribesman (Russell Baze) (owned by Kjell Qvale, last owner of Silky Sullivan}
 2007 - Bilo
 2006 - Da Stoops (Victor Espinoza)
 2005 - Jet West
 2004 - Areyoutalkintome
 2003 - Green Team
 2002 - Unlimited Value
 2001 - Ceeband
 2000 - Full Moon Madness
 1999 - Love That Red
 1998 - Big Jag
 1997 - Red
 1996 - Testimony
 1995 - Wild Gold
 1994 - Uncaged Fury
 1993 - Softshoe Sure Shot
 1992 - Answer Do
 1991 - Letthebighossroll
 1990 - Valiant Pete

References
 Oak Tree racing meet at Santa Anita
  The California Cup Sprint at Pedigree Query.com

Horse races in California
Graded stakes races in the United States
Open sprint category horse races
Racing series for horses
Recurring sporting events established in 1990
1990 establishments in California